Corey Stanley Clark (born June 21, 1984) is a former American football offensive tackle for the San Diego Chargers of the National Football League. He was drafted by the Chargers in the seventh round of the 2008 NFL Draft. He played college football at Texas A&M.

Early years
Clark attended Smithson Valley High School in Spring Branch, Texas.

Professional career

San Diego Chargers
During the Chargers' 2008 minicamps, he practiced as a right tackle. He signed a four-year contract with the team on June 30, 2008. According to the Chargers, he will "most likely battle for a reserve role along the offensive line".

Clark remained on the active roster for the first nine games of the 2008 season, but was cut on November 14 to make room for safety Tra Battle. He was then re-signed to the team's practice squad on November 18. The following day, he was re-signed to the active roster when wide receiver Buster Davis was placed on injured reserve. He was not active for any of the games during the 2008 season.

Clark was waived on December 1, 2009 and was re-signed to the practice squad on December 5.

After his contract expired at season's end, Clark signed a future contract with the Chargers on January 22, 2010. However, on August 9, 2010, he retired from football to focus more on his family.

References

External links

San Diego Chargers bio
Texas A&M Aggies bio

1984 births
Living people
People from Comal County, Texas
Players of American football from Texas
American football offensive tackles
Texas A&M Aggies football players
San Diego Chargers players